Tornelasmias capricorni was a species of minute air-breathing land snail, a terrestrial pulmonate gastropod mollusk or micromollusk in the family Achatinellidae. This species was endemic to Blackburn Island, off the coast of Australia; it is now extinct.

References

Capricorni
Extinct gastropods
Taxonomy articles created by Polbot